Fat Friends The Musical is a stage musical by Kay Mellor with music by Nick Lloyd Webber, based on Mellor's ITV series Fat Friends.

Production History

2017-18 UK tour 
The musical made its world premiere at the Grand Theatre, Leeds in November 2017, prior to a UK tour from January to June 2018. The tour starred Jodie Prenger as Kelly, Andrew "Freddie" Flintoff in his musical theatre debut as Kevin (alternating with Joel Montague in certain venues), Sam Bailey as Betty (Elaine C. Smith at certain venues), Kevin Kennedy as Fergus, Natalie Anderson as Lauren, Natasha Hamilton as Julia Fleshman and Rachael Wooding as Joanne.

2022 UK tour 
In June 2021, it was announced the show would embark on a second UK tour. The tour will open in at the Orchard Theatre, Dartford from January 2022 before touring across the UK until July 2022 and will star Jessica Ellis as Kelly, Lee Mead as Kevin, Les Dennis as Fergus and Sherrie Hewson as Julia Fleshman.

Musical numbers 

 Act I
 "Move It" - Lauren and Ensemble
 "Be My Man" - Kelly
 "Big And Battered" - Fergus and Alan
 "Corset Song" - Kelly, Joanne, Betty and Lauren
 "What Happened" - Kelly, Joanne, Betty and Lauren
 "Stuck On You" - Kelly and Kevin
 "Mr. Someone" - Lauren and Paul
 "Step Up" - Lauren, Alan and Ensemble
 "Diets Are Crap" - Kelly
 "Going Global" - Joanne, Alan, Betty and Ensemble
 "Stinking Rich" - Julia and Ensemble
 "Beautiful" - Kelly
 Act II
 "The Slimmer's Club" - Ensemble
 "Chocolate" - Val, Kelly, Betty and Ensemble
 "Fun Boy" - Kelly and Female Ensemble
 "The Only Fool Is Me" - Kevin
 "If You Don't Want To Marry Him" - Betty, Fergus and Kelly
 "Love Who You Are" - Ensemble

Cast and characters

References

External links 
 Official website

2017 musicals
British musicals
Musicals based on television series